Ghosts of Mars (titled onscreen as John Carpenter's Ghosts of Mars) is a 2001 American science fiction action horror film written, directed and scored by John Carpenter. It was produced by Screen Gems and distributed by Sony Pictures Releasing. The film stars Natasha Henstridge, Ice Cube, Jason Statham, Pam Grier, Clea DuVall, and Joanna Cassidy. Set on a colonized Mars in the 22nd century, the film follows a squad of police officers and a convicted criminal who fight against the residents of a mining colony who have been possessed by the ghosts of the planet's original inhabitants.

The film received mostly negative reviews and was a box office bomb, earning $14 million against a $28 million production budget. The film would be John Carpenter's last feature until his return with The Ward in 2010.

The film has received a cult following since its release, with critics praising the action sequences, soundtrack and blending of genres. Given the film's debt to Western cinema, particularly the works of Howard Hawks, it has been considered by a number of critics as an example of the Weird Western subgenre.

Plot
Set in the second half of the 22nd century, Mars has been 84% terraformed, giving the planet an Earth-like atmosphere. Martian society has become matriarchal, centering on the city of Chryse, with smaller, far-reaching outposts connected by an expansive network of trains. In the wake of a series of mysterious 'incidents', Mars Police Force officer Lt. Melanie Ballard is called before a tribunal to give testimony following a disastrous mission to the remote mining outpost Shining Canyon to retrieve convicted felon James 'Desolation' Williams of which she is apparently the sole survivor.

Through a series of flashbacks, and flashbacks within flashbacks as new perspectives are incorporated into the narrative, Ballard recounts her mission to Shining Canyon. Accompanied by commanding officer Helena Braddock, cocky sergeant Jericho Butler and rookie officers Bashira Kincaid and Michael Descanso, Ballard arrives at Shining Canyon to find the town seemingly deserted. Investigating the town's jail, Braddock discovers a trio of individuals who appear to have sealed themselves into one of the cells; among them science officer Dr. Arlene Whitlock.

Ballard and Butler discover a number of disoriented miners and an escaped Desolation. The group are soon attacked by several of the miners, forcing Ballard and Desolation to band together and incapacitate them. Ballard is forced to shoot and kill one of them, causing their affliction to be passed on to one of the three survivors. Butler, venturing out to the edge of town in pursuit of one of the feral miners, discovers a row of severed heads mounted on spikes, including the head of Commander Braddock, and a large assembly in the canyon below committing horrific acts of self-mutilation and ritualistic execution.

Desolation's associates soon arrive and force Ballard and Butler to release him. While they originally plan on leaving the officers and remaining miners to die, Ballard convinces them to work together to survive. Their initial effort to escape is halted when the army of feral miners converge on their position, killing, injuring and infecting several of their number. Confronted by Ballard, Whitlock eventually explains that she fled from her post after discovering an ancient underground vault created by an extinct Martian civilization. When the door to the vault was opened, it released hostile spirits or "ghosts", which took possession of the workers, causing their violent behavior. Killing a possessed human merely releases the Martian spirit to possess another host. Ballard surmises that these Martian spirits believe humans to be an invading race. Ballard is briefly possessed until Butler feeds her a hallucinogenic drug, which forces the Martian spirit to leave her body.

The group are forced to flee as the possessed workers breach the jail, leaving only Ballard, Desolation, Butler, Kincaid and Whitlock left alive. While they are able to make it to the train, Ballard realizes that they have a duty to exterminate the Martian threat and decide to return to Shining Canyon to overload the outpost's nuclear power plant, assuming that the ensuing atomic blast will vaporize the spirits. While they are able to initiate the meltdown, Whitlock is possessed, while Butler, Kincaid and the two train operators are killed. Boarding the train, the two watch as the army is engulfed in the explosion. Desolation tends to Ballard's wounds. Unwilling to face the authorities, he handcuffs Ballard to her cot and leaves. She moves to shoot him, but realizes her respect for him and lets him make his escape.

Resting after her tribunal, Ballard is woken by an alert that the city is under attack. Realizing their attempt to destroy the spirits failed, she readies herself to face the onslaught alone until she is greeted by Desolation, who hands her a weapon. The two agree to fight their way out of the city together.

Cast

 Natasha Henstridge as Lieutenant Melanie Ballard
 Ice Cube as James "Desolation" Williams
 Jason Statham as Sergeant Jericho Butler
 Clea DuVall as Officer Bashira Kincaid
 Pam Grier as Commander Helena Braddock
 Joanna Cassidy as Dr. Arlene Whitlock
 Richard Cetrone as Big Daddy Mars
 Eileen Weisinger as Woman Warrior
 Liam Waite as Officer Michael Descanso
 Duane Davis as "Uno" Williams
 Lobo Sebastian as "Dos"
 Rodney A. Grant as "Tres"
 Peter Jason as McSimms
 Wanda De Jesus as Akooshay
 Robert Carradine as Rodale
 Rosemary Forsyth as Inquisitor
 Doug McGrath as Benchley
 Rick Edelstein as Zimmerman
 Rex Linn as Yared
 Marjean Holden as Young Woman
 Charlotte Cornwell as The Narrator

Production

It has been widely reported that the script to Ghosts of Mars originally started off as a potential Snake Plissken sequel. However, this rumor has been publicly dispelled by the film's producer, Sandy King Carpenter.

Michelle Yeoh, Franka Potente and Famke Janssen were the first choices for the role of Melanie Ballard, but they turned it down. Courtney Love was originally cast, but she left the project after her boyfriend's ex-wife's cousin ran over her foot. Natasha Henstridge replaced her by the suggestion of her boyfriend Liam Waite. Jason Statham was originally going to play Desolation Williams, but he was replaced by Ice Cube because the producers needed some star power for the part, and Statham instead played the character of Jericho Butler.

Although Mars has a day/night cycle almost identical in length to Earth's, most of the film is set at night. Mars is shown only once in the daytime, in a flashback when a scientist describes how she found and opened a tunnel, unleashing the alien spirits.

Filming began on August 8, 2000, and ended on October 31, 2000. Production had to be shut down for a week when Henstridge fell ill due to extreme diarrhoea as she had just done two other films back-to-back before joining production at the last moment.

Much of the film was shot in a New Mexico gypsum mine. The pure white gypsum had to be dyed with thousands of gallons of blood to recreate the red Martian landscape.

John Carpenter revealed after the movie's failure that he had become inspired and driven after he had made Ghosts of Mars, and decided to leave Hollywood for good.

Release

Critical reception
Ghosts of Mars received mostly negative reviews. Rotten Tomatoes gives the film a score of 24% based on 110 reviews, with the consensus stating "John Carpenter's Ghosts of Mars is not one of Carpenter's better movies, filled as it is with bad dialogue, bad acting, confusing flashbacks, and scenes that are more campy than scary." Audiences polled by CinemaScore gave the film an average grade of "C−" on an A+ to F scale.

Rita Kempley of The Washington Post called the film "a schlocky, sluggish shoot-em-up", giving the film one star out of five, and later listing the film as the 3rd worst film of the year. Marc Savlov of The Austin Chronicle gave the film one star out of five, saying "Ghosts of Mars is a muddled, derivative, and embarrassing disaster straight on through." Bruce Fretts of Entertainment Weekly said about the film "...it's distressingly amateurish and hackneyed to the point of absurdity," further adding "it's dishearting to see the 'master of horror' bring himself to both write and direct a film with such a prepubescent understanding of horror". James Berardinelli gave the film 1.5 stars out of four. Rob Gonsalves of eFilmCritic.com suggested that the film was symbolic of "Carpenter at rock bottom". According to press reviews, factors contributing to the box office failure of the film included "poor set designs, hammy acting and a poorly developed script".

Conversely, Roger Ebert of the Chicago Sun-Times, gave the film three stars out of four, writing, "Ghosts of Mars delivers on its chosen level and I enjoyed it, but I wonder why so many science-fiction films turn into extended exercises in Blast the Aliens...this is an instance where it works." Richard Roeper also awarded the film three stars out of four, saying "is it stupid? Certainly. I think that's the point. Carpenter is a smart man and he knows exactly what he's doing. I miss seeing campy action flicks like this at the drive-in." David Stratton and Margaret Pomeranz, film critics for The Movie Show, both awarded the film three stars out of five. In his review, Stratton made the following observation – "John Carpenter doesn't seem to have moved forward from the 70s and early 80s, when he made his best films. Though it's not terribly exciting, Ghosts Of Mars does have a marvelously skewed vision and can deliver genuine morbid laughs when it wants to."

Ice Cube was very critical about the movie: "I don't like that movie. I'm a big fan of John Carpenter and the only reason I did it was because John Carpenter directed it but they really didn't have the money to pull the special effects off."

Responding to the criticism towards the film, Carpenter stated he was intentionally trying to make Ghosts of Mars as over-the-top and tongue-in-cheek as possible. He claimed he was trying to make a mindless and silly, yet highly entertaining and thrilling, action flick where "the universe allows its characters and plot points to be silly without becoming full-fledged comedies", akin to 80s movies like Commando, Rambo: First Blood Part II, and Predator. Looking back on the film and its criticism, he stated he was frustrated that most people thought the film was meant to be a serious horror movie, and feels that he should've made the film more openly comedic and "in on the joke", saying "I have no power over what critics say, but when people complained about the movie being campy and not scary...the name of the movie is Ghosts Of Mars, I figured the campiness would be self-explanatory."

Box office
The film opened at No. 9 in the North American box office in its opening weekend (8/24-26) with $3,804,452, grossed $8,709,640 in the North American domestic box office, and $5,301,192 internationally, totaling $14,010,832 worldwide. On a budget of $28 million, Ghosts of Mars was a box office disappointment.

Soundtrack

For the film's soundtrack, John Carpenter recorded a number of synthesizer pieces and assembled an all-star cast of guitarists (including thrash metal band Anthrax, virtuoso Steve Vai, genre spanning Buckethead, and former Guns N' Roses/current Nine Inch Nails guitarist Robin Finck) to record an energetic and technically proficient heavy metal score. Reaction to the soundtrack was mixed; many critics praised the high standard of musicianship and the strong pairing of heavy metal riffs with the film's action sequences, but complained about the overlong guitar solos, the drastic differences between the cues used in the film and the full tracks and the absence of any of the film's ambient synth score from the soundtrack CD.

Track listing
 "Ghosts of Mars" (3:42) – Steve Vai, Bucket Baker & John Carpenter
 "Love " (4:37) – Buckethead, Robin Finck, John Carpenter & Anthrax (Scott Ian, Paul Crook, Frank Bello & Charlie Benante)
 "Fight Train" (3:16) – Robin Finck, John Carpenter & Anthrax
 "Visions of Earth" (4:08) – Elliot Easton & John Carpenter
 "Slashing Gash" (2:46) – Elliot Easton & John Carpenter
 "Kick Ass" (6:06) – Buckethead, John Carpenter & Anthrax
 "Power Station" (4:37) – Robin Finck, John Carpenter & Anthrax
 "Can't Let You Go" (2:18) – Stone (J.J. Garcia, Brian James & Brad Wilson), John Carpenter, Bruce Robb & Joe Robb
 "Dismemberment Blues" (2:53) – Elliot Easton, John Carpenter & Stone
 "Fighting Mad" (2:41) – Buckethead & John Carpenter
 "Pam Grier's Head" (2:35) – Elliot Easton, John Carpenter & Anthrax
 "Ghost Popping" (3:20) – Steve Vai, Robin Finck, John Carpenter & Anthrax

See also

List of ghost films
List of films set on Mars
Mars in fiction
List of films featuring extraterrestrials

References

External links
 
 
 
 
 
 Ghosts of Mars at John Carpenter's official site

2001 films
2001 horror films
2001 science fiction action films
2000s ghost films
2000s science fiction horror films
American action horror films
American ghost films
American science fantasy films
American science fiction action films
American space adventure films
American supernatural horror films
Films about extraterrestrial life
Films directed by John Carpenter
Films scored by John Carpenter
Films set in the 22nd century
Films shot in New Mexico
Fiction set in the 2170s
Mars in film
American nonlinear narrative films
Films with screenplays by John Carpenter
Films about self-harm
2000s English-language films
2000s American films